The 2019 F4 Danish Championship season was the third season of the F4 Danish Championship. The season began at Padborg Park in April and concluded at Jyllandsringen in October.

Teams and drivers
All teams and drivers were Danish-registered.

Calendar

Race results

Championship standings

Points were awarded to the top 10 classified finishers in each race. No points were awarded for pole position or fastest lap.

Drivers' standings

Teams' championship

Notes:
† – Drivers did not finish the race, but were classified as they completed over 75% of the race distance.

References

External links
 

Danish F4 Championship
F4 Danish Championship
F4 Danish Championship seasons
Danish F4